The Xupu Bridge, is a cable-stayed bridge over the Huangpu River in Shanghai, China, so named because it connects the city's Xuhui and Pudong districts. It opened in 1997 and carries 8 lanes of the S20 Outer Ring Expressway.

See also

 List of tallest bridges in the world
 List of largest cable-stayed bridges

References

External links

Cable-stayed bridges in China
Bridges in Shanghai
Transport in Shanghai
Bridges completed in 1997